John Robert Keeble (born November 24, 1944) is a Canadian-American author. Primarily a novelist, he is best known for his novel Yellowfish (1980) and Broken Ground (1987). He has also written short stories and nonfiction. In 2019, he won an O. Henry Award for his short story, "Synchronicity", which was published in Harper's Magazine.

Keeble is known for his literary treatment of political and ecological concerns, particularly in the western landscape of North America, as well as for his exploration of the intersections and tensions between the past and present of the American West and the people and animals who inhabit these spaces.

Biography

Keeble was born in Winnipeg, Manitoba, Canada, and raised in Saskatchewan until his parents moved the family to California. The son of a minister, Keeble holds dual Canadian and U.S. citizenship. Keeble attended the University of Redlands (Bachelor of Arts, "magna cum laude", 1966), and the University of Iowa (Master of Fine Arts, 1969). Additionally, he attended Brown University for one year (1971/72).  He began adult life as a musician, but turned seriously to writing while at the University of Iowa.

He has also worked as an educator, having taught at Grinnell College (1969-1972) and Eastern Washington University (1973-2002). At Eastern Washington University, he is presently Professor Emeritus. He was Distinguished Visiting Writer at Boise State University in spring 2006, and held the Coal Royalty Trust Chair in Creative Writing at the University of Alabama (Fall Semesters, 1992, 1998, 2002). He also served at Alabama as a Visiting Professor in 1995/96.

Personal life
He is a longtime resident of Spokane County in Eastern Washington state where he and his wife, Claire, a musician, built their log home on a small farm.  They have three sons and three grandchildren.

Awards
His awards include a John Simon Guggenheim Memorial Foundation Fellowship, the Washington State Governor's Award., and Eastern Washington University Trustee's Medal for Teaching and Research (1980).

He was nominated in 1993 for a Northwest Regional Emmy for his writing of the documentary film "To Write and Keep Kind," a biography of Raymond Carver., which won a Blue Ribbon at the American International Video Festival (1993) and First Prize in the Documentary Category at the New York Film Festival (1993).

He was nominated for a Pulitzer Prize for the piece "Black Spring in Valdez," written for The Village Voice about the Exxon Valdez oil spill in 1989; Keeble arrived at the site on April 8, 1989, and traveled back and forth from his home in Spokane County, Washington, to interview fishermen and Native Americans, public and corporate officials, and hundreds of scientists for the human-caused environmental disaster.

Broadcast Media
He was the script writer for To Write and Keep Kind, a documentary on the life of Raymond Carver funded by the National Endowment for the Arts and aired on Public Broadcasting System in 1992. He was later a literary consultant for Westword, a National Endowment for the Arts-funded documentary on Western Fiction Writing, which aired on the Public Broadcasting System in 1995.

Selected works
 Novels
 Crab Canon (1971) New York: Grossman Publishers
 Mine (1974, co-authored with Ransom Jeffery) New York: Grossman Publishers. 
 Yellowfish (1980) New York: Harper & Row. 
 Broken Ground (1987) New York: Harper & Row.  ; ' cited as one of the best hundred books in Literary Oregon, One Hundred Books, 1900-2000 (2005)
The Shadows of Owls (2013) University of Washington Press. 
The Appointment: The Tale of Adaline Carson (2019) Lynx House Press.

Short story collections
 Nocturnal America (2006)  Lincoln : University of Nebraska Press. 
Winner of the  Prairie Schooner Book Prize in Fiction

 Prize-winning short stories
 "The Fishers," Finalist, National Magazine Award for Short Fiction (1993)
 "The Chasm," Best American Short Stories (1994)
"Synchronicity," The O. Henry Prize Stories (2019)

Nonfiction and Essays
 Out of the Channel: The Exxon Valdez Oil Spill in Prince William Sound (1991;Expanded and Revised Tenth Anniversary Edition, 1999) 
 "Trejo's Perfect Havoc," in Ruben Trejo: Beyond Boundaries / Aztlán y Más Allá, edited by Ben Mitchell, University of Washington Press (2010) (memoir)

Further reading
 "Dialogues with Northwest Writers," Northwest Review, V.20, Nos. 2 & 3, 1982.
 The Writers Mind: Interviews with American Authors, V.III, ed. by Irv Broughton, University of Arkansas Press, 1990.
 Talking Up a Storm: Voices of the New West, ed. by Gregory L. Morris, University of Nebraska Press, 1994.
 Listening to the Land: conversations About Nature, Culture, and Eros, ed. by Derrick Jensen, Sierra Club Books, 1995.
 Truths Among Us: Conversations on Building a New Future, ed. by Derrick Jensen, Flashpoint Press, 2011.

References

External links
 

1944 births
20th-century American novelists
20th-century Canadian novelists
21st-century American novelists
21st-century Canadian novelists
American male novelists
American male short story writers
Canadian male novelists
Canadian male short story writers
20th-century Canadian short story writers
21st-century Canadian short story writers
Exxon Valdez oil spill
Living people
20th-century American short story writers
21st-century American short story writers
Writers from Winnipeg
20th-century Canadian male writers
21st-century Canadian male writers
20th-century American male writers
21st-century American male writers